Max Planck Institut für Eisenforschung, a German Research institute focussed on Iron and Steel research
 Myanma Pharmaceutical Industry Enterprise
 Meeting People Is Easy, a book